ABC Coffs Coast is an ABC Local Radio station based in Coffs Harbour and broadcasting to the Coffs Coast region in New South Wales, Australia.

History 
Originally part of ABC Mid North Coast, the ABC set up a bureau at 24 Gordon Street in Coffs Harbour in 1994, which then evolved into a broadcasting studio with a wide range of services. Due to high demand, the bureau decided to break off from the ABC Mid North Coast and become ABC Coffs Coast.

The studio had to be rebuilt twice, both times due to floods, in November 1996 and April 2009.

Local Programs

Weekdays

 Breakfast with Fiona Poole – 6:00 AM to 7:45 AM

When local programs are not broadcast the station is a relay of ABC Mid North Coast and 702 ABC Sydney.

References

See also
 List of radio stations in Australia

Coffs Coast
Radio stations in New South Wales
Coffs Harbour